This is a list of Albanian music composers.

Folk and Contemporary
 Palokë Kurti (1858–1920)
 Kristo Kono (1907–1991)
 Rexho Mulliqi (1923–1982)
 Avni Mula (1928–2020)
 Agim Krajka (1937–2021)
 Vasil Tole (born 1963)
 Pirro Çako (1965)
 Flori Mumajesi (1982)

Classical and Film
 Lorenc Antoni (1909–1991)
 Prenkë Jakova (1917–1969)
 Nikolla Zoraqi (1921–1991)
 Mustafa Krantja (1921–2002)
 Simon Gjoni (1925–1991)
 Tonin Harapi (1925–1991)
 Tish Daija (1926–2004)
 Çesk Zadeja (1927–1997)
 Feim Ibrahimi (1935–1997)
 Gjon Simoni (1936–1999)
 Limoz Dizdari (1942)
 Lejla Agolli (born 1950)
 Aleksandër Peçi (1951)
 David Tukiçi (1956)
 Thomas Simaku (1958)

References

Albania

Composers